The Dublin Marathon is an annual 26.2 mile (42.2 km) road marathon in Dublin, Ireland, held on the last Sunday in October. Prior to 2016, the race took place on the last Monday in October, which is a public holiday in Ireland.  Held each year since 1980, the marathon had a record 22,500 registrants for the 2019 race, including over 5,000 entrants from outside Ireland.

History

The race was founded in 1980 by a group led by Noel Carroll, who persuaded the Business Houses Athletic Association (BHAA) to take up the idea. In the first year, 2,100 took part, of whom 1,420 finished. Dick Hooper of Raheny club Raheny Shamrock Athletic Club claimed first place, in a time of 2:16:14. The women's winner was Carey May who finished in 2:42:11. That year's runner-up was Neil Cusack, who returned in 1981 to post a winning time of 2:13:59.

Jerry Kiernan's 1982 time of 2:13:45 was a long-standing men's course record. This was finally improved upon by Lezan Kipkosgei Kimutai over twenty years later in 2004, but Russian runner Aleksey Sokolov twice broke the record with consecutive wins in 2006/07, running 2:11:39 then 2:09:07 the next year. Moses Kangogo Kibet became the first man under 2:09 in Dublin with his win in 2:08:58. The current men's record is 2:08:06 set by Othmane El Goumri in 2019.

Moira O'Neill was the first woman under two hours and forty minutes with her win of	2:37:06 in 1988 and home athlete Christine Kennedy improved this with a run of 2:35:56 three years later. Kenyan Ruth Kutol win in 2:27:22 in 2003 was the first sub-2:30 time and Russian Tatyana Aryasova broke this record in 2010 with her current women's record of 2:26:13.

The participation level of the race has followed an upward trend: by 1988 the number of participants had increased to 8,700 –  up from the 4,000 the previous year. It was not until 2000 that the 1988 participation record was finally broken when 8,900 took part. An increasing number of people took part every year in the late 2000s, with 11,000 at the 2007 edition. Entry levels have since increased significantly year-on-year with 19,500 completing the 2016 event.

In 2001 the marathon became part of the Dublin Race Series, which includes pre-marathon events of 5 miles, 10 kilometres, 10 miles and half marathon distance over the preceding months, run in the Phoenix Park and Swords.

A competitor died while running in the 2006 marathon, and another in the 2013 marathon.

In October 2015, it was announced that from 2016 the marathon would be held on Sunday rather than the October bank holiday Monday to attract more overseas runners.

The 2020 and 2021 editions of the race were cancelled due to the coronavirus pandemic, with all entries made valid for the following year and all registrants given the option of obtaining a full refund.

Course 

The course is generally reasonably flat. It starts at Fitzwilliam Square in the city centre and concludes at Merrion Square. Exact routing varies, although in recent years the race has proceeded in an anti-clockwise direction around the city, including passing through the Phoenix Park before moving towards the southside suburbs.

Race series

The marathon is part of a race series that includes four other races: the Fingal 4 Mile, the South Dublin 10K, the Frank Duffy 10 Mile, and the Dublin Half Marathon.

Prizes 

The overall winner receives the Noel Carroll Memorial Trophy.  Both winners also receive 12,000 EUR.

Winners 

Key:
  Course record (in bold)
  Irish championship race

Wheelchair 

Only male winners of the wheelchair division have been recorded, with the exceptions of 2002, 2004 and 2005.

Broadcast coverage

See also
 Women's Mini Marathon, a 10K run in Dublin

Notes

References

List of winners
Heyworth, Malcolm et al. (2010-11-18). Dublin Marathon. Association of Road Racing Statisticians. Retrieved on 2011-11-01.

External links

 Official website
 2012 Route Map
Race profile at Marathon Info

Recurring sporting events established in 1980
Marathons in Europe
Athletics in Dublin (city)
1980 establishments in Ireland
Annual events in Ireland
Autumn events in the Republic of Ireland
Wheelchair marathons